Lac du Chambon is a reservoir on the Romanche river in Isère, Rhône-Alpes, France. At an elevation of 1040 m, its surface area is 1.4 km².

Chambon